Barucynips is a genus of gall wasp consisting of a single species described in 2013: Barucynips panamensis.

References

Cynipidae
Hymenoptera genera

Taxa described in 2013